Sergeant Albert Gill  (8 September 1879 – 27 July 1916) was an English recipient of the Victoria Cross, the highest and most prestigious award for gallantry in the face of the enemy that can be awarded to British and Commonwealth forces.

Gill was born in Birmingham, then in Warwickshire, and was employed as a postal worker with the GPO.

Battle of Delville Wood 

Gill was 36 years old, and a sergeant in the 1st Battalion, The King's Royal Rifle Corps, British Army during the First World War when the following deed took place for which he was awarded the VC:

Gill is buried at Delville Wood Commonwealth War Graves Commission Cemetery, Somme, France.

The Medal
Gill's Victoria Cross is in the Lord Ashcroft VC Collection at the Imperial War Museum.

Memorials 

Gill is commemorated by a plaque attached to post box B66 52, a Victorian-era wall post box, outside City Hospital in Birmingham, England.

References

Further reading
Monuments to Courage (David Harvey, 1999)
The Register of the Victoria Cross (This England, 1997)
VCs of the First World War - The Somme (Gerald Gliddon, 1994)

External links
VC medal auction details

1879 births
1916 deaths
King's Royal Rifle Corps soldiers
British Battle of the Somme recipients of the Victoria Cross
British military personnel killed in the Battle of the Somme
British Army personnel of World War I
Military personnel from Birmingham, West Midlands
British Army recipients of the Victoria Cross
Burials at Delville Wood Cemetery
People from Ladywood